Beta Sigma Phi International is a non-academic sorority with 200,000 members in chapters around the world. Founded in Abilene, Kansas, in 1931 by Walter W. Ross "for the social, cultural, and civic enrichment of its members", the organization is now present throughout the United States and Canada, and in 30 other countries.

History

In April 1932 Beta Sigma Phi was incorporated under a charter granted by the state of Missouri. Today, Beta Sigma Phi is a nonprofit corporation which maintains a contract with Walter W. Ross & Company for business management of its affairs. In addition to the International Constitution, each chapter composes its own bylaws.

The organization started out under the name: "The National 'What to Read' Club". Walter Ross, the founder of Beta Sigma Phi, visited Vinita, Oklahoma, where librarian Leona Schroers agreed to help establish a chapter in the town, and introduced Ross to Sally Rogers McSpadden, sister of the humorist Will Rogers. McSpadden was active in the Oklahoma Federation of Women's Clubs, as well as other women's organizations, and advised Ross to change the organisation from an association to its present form, along with changing the name. A new framework for the organization was developed, with the Greek letter name derived from the sorority's motto: the letters, "Beta", "Sigma", and "Phi" were the first letters of the Greek words for "life, learning, and friendship".

The organization initiated its millionth member, Denise Emerson, in 1995, rushed by Debbie Virene of Gamma Alpha Iota Chapter in Ontario, California.

Activities
Beta Sigma Phi is primarily social. Most chapters are community based, but Beta Sigma Phi also has chapters on college campuses, and several online chapters. The sorority organizes annual state conventions.

The Torch is the magazine of Beta Sigma Phi, and is a 32-page magazine publishing stories and poems by members, personality sketches of International Honorary Members and others, and short story and poetry contests.

Programs
International Endowment Fund - (health research groups & charities)
Disaster Relief Fund - (aids members who are victims of natural disasters)
Breast Cancer Research Fund - (supports research organizations)
Scholarship Fund - (awards scholarships to members, their children and grandchildren)

References

External links
Official site
Beta Sigma Phi International Sorority 75th Anniversary
Elva M. Chandler papers at Hagley Museum and Library. Elva Chandler was a charter member of Beta Sigma Phi. This collection has records from National Beta Sigma Phi (1937-1974); Middle Eastern Council of Beta Sigma Phi (1935-1978); Wilmington City Council of Beta Sigma Phi (1934-1977); Delaware Chapters of Beta Sigma Phi (1934-1972); personal correspondence related to Beta Sigma Phi (1936-1940); and  Nu Phi Mu (1945-1953), a sister organization for younger women interested in Beta Sigma Phi. The collection documents national rituals, programs, and degrees, such as the Pledge Ritual, the Ritual of Jewels, and a ritual to honor a deceased sister; fund-raising efforts; periodic announcements from the national president and other officers; and records from regional, state, and local chapters. At some point for many of these chapters, Elva served as president.

International student societies
Student societies in the United States
Fraternities and sororities in the United States
Student organizations established in 1931
1931 establishments in Kansas